Julian Edward Peter Jarrold (born 15 May 1960 in Norwich, Norfolk) is a BAFTA Award-nominated English film and television director.

Early life
Jarrold was born into the family which founded Jarrolds of Norwich in 1823. He was educated at Gresham's School, Holt, and Trinity & All Saints College.

Career
Jarrold directed Great Expectations, starring Ioan Gruffudd, in 1999. The Boston Globe felt that Jarrold helped distinguish it from the many other adaptations by "keeping the reins in on his characters, emotionally and morally. They are unromanticized and low-key performances that only rarely spill over into the maudlin and righteous." In 2006, Jarrold directed Kinky Boots. The Chicago Tribune called the film "quite enjoyable, effortlessly well-done on every level, even moving at times, but relatively lightweight." In 2007, Becoming Jane was released. The Washington Times stated that Jarrold's direction "has made a witty, beautiful film. His technical achievement is no small matter, with nice, long tracking shots and clever focus tricks."

The following year, Jarrold directed the first film adaptation of Evelyn Waugh's iconic story Brideshead Revisited, "one of the great English novels which has never been filmed," according to producer Kevin Loader. It starred Hayley Atwell, Matthew Goode, Emma Thompson, and Michael Gambon. About the novel's status as an unchangeable classic, Jarrold stated that "there are people who are obsessive and obviously that's going to be daunting when they come and judge us. I've had a few people who have said, 'Why are you doing it?' But I think there is a generation who know nothing about Brideshead Revisited, who haven't read the book or who are only dimly aware of the TV series because it's been repeated on ITV4 or something." The Daily Telegraph felt that Jarrold's "scenes are filled with grand period detail – huge Rolls-Royces, ice sculptures, vast fireplaces of sculptured marble – but he stops it from becoming an overblown, glossy spectacle by making the world around the characters feel like a dream."

Jarrold directed the HBO film The Girl in 2013. The director received his first Emmy nomination for his work in the film. Mandalay Vision has hired Jarrold to direct the serial killer film Exit 147, with a script written by Travis Milloy. Producer Cathy Schulman and Matthew Rhodes are producing the film for Mandalay. In February 2013, Taylor Kitsch joined the film to play lead as a sadistic sheriff. Most recently Jarrold directed A Royal Night Out for Ecosse Films. The movie was released in May 2015.

In 2016, Jarrold became a judge at the Norwich Film Festival, while in 2017, he became a patron of the festival.

Filmography as director

Dramarama (1983) TV Series (episodes)
Children's Ward, TV Series (1990–)
Fighting for Gemma (1993)
Cracker: The Big Crunch (1994) TV Episode
Medics: All in the Mind (1994) TV Episode
Medics: Changing Faces (1994) TV Episode
Some Kind of Life (1995)
Silent Witness (1996) TV Series (episodes)
Touching Evil: Deadly Web, TV Episode
 Touching Evil: Through the Clouds, TV Episode
Painted Lady (1997)
All the King's Men (1999)
Great Expectations (1999)
Never Never (2000)
White Teeth (2002)
 Crime and Punishment (2002) TV Film
The Canterbury Tales: The Man of Law's Tale (2003)
Anonymous Rex (2004)
Kinky Boots (2005)
Becoming Jane (2007)
Brideshead Revisited (2008)
 Red Riding '1974' (2009)
The Girl (2012)
The Great Train Robbery (2013)
A Royal Night Out (2015)
The Crown (2016) TV series (2 episodes)
Sulphur and White (2020)
 The Good Mothers (2023) TV series (6 episodes)

Filmography as producer
The Other Side of Midnight (1988), TV mini-series presented by Tony Wilson

References

External links

1960 births
English film directors
English television directors
Living people
People educated at Gresham's School
People from Norwich
Alumni of Leeds Trinity University